
Gmina Kłomnice is a rural gmina (administrative district) in Częstochowa County, Silesian Voivodeship, in southern Poland.

Villages
Gmina Kłomnice contains the villages and settlements of Adamów, Bartkowice, Chmielarze, Chorzenice, Garnek, Huby, Karczewice, Kłomnice, Konary, Kuźnica, Lipicze, Michałów, Michałów Rudnicki, Nieznanice, Niwki, Pacierzów, Rzeki Małe, Rzeki Wielkie, Rzerzęczyce, Skrzydlów, Śliwaków, Witkowice, Zawada and Zdrowa.

Neighbouring gminas
Gmina Kłomnice is bordered by the gminas of Dąbrowa Zielona, Gidle, Kruszyna, Mstów, Mykanów and Rędziny.

References

Klomnice
Częstochowa County